German colonization may refer to:

German colonization of the Americas
German colonization of Valdivia, Osorno and Llanquihue
German colonization of Africa
German colonization in the Pacific Ocean

See also
 German colonial empire
 Ostsiedlung, medieval eastward migration
 Drang nach Osten, 19th century expansion into Slavic lands 
 Lebensraum, Nazi reinterpretation of Drang nach Osten